Šárka Pančochová (born 1 November 1990) is a Czech snowboarder. She started snowboarding in 2002 at her local mountains in Moravia, Czech Republic.

Career 
Šárka got her first sponsor in the 2005/06 season. In 2007/2008 at the Swatch TTR World Snowboard Tour, Pančochová won the 3Star Quiksilver Snowjam and the Protest and O2 World Rookie fests. In the same season, she won the title of FIS Junior World Champion in Valmalenco, Italy.

In 2008/09, she won at the 4Star Horsefeathers Pleasure Jam in Austria and ended the season as World No. 8 on the TTR World Rankings.

In 2009/10, Pančochová followed the (Ticket to Ride (World Snowboard Tour)) and finished the season as World No. 3. Šárka had her first six-star podium moment at the Burton European Open, where she placed third in slopestyle.

At the 2010 Winter Olympics, she represented the Czech Republic and placed 14th in the halfpipe. Pančochová won a silver medal in slopestyle at the 2011 FIS Snowboarding World Championships.

In 2014, she qualified to the 2014 Winter Olympics. She competed in the Slopestyle competition and made the final. On her second run, she had one of the worst crashes of the competition cracking her helmet but wasn't injured. Her first-run score of 86.25 was enough for a fifth-place finish. She was taken to hospital for observation of possible concussion symptoms but was able to compete in Halfpipe several days later.  She advanced to the semifinal round, and finished 10th in her semi.

Personal life

Pančochová came out as gay in an interview with Outsports in 2017. She said she was "stoked" to discuss it publicly but also said it was "really not a big deal" anymore.

Recent competition history

Highlights of Swatch TTR 2009/2010 Season 
 7th – Slopestyle – 5Star Burton New Zealand Open (Ticket to Ride (World Snowboard Tour))
 3rd – Slopestyle – 6Star Burton European Open (Ticket to Ride (World Snowboard Tour))
 2nd – Big Air – 3Star Billabong Bro Down (Ticket to Ride (World Snowboard Tour))
 4th – Slopestyle – 6Star Roxy Chicken Jam Europe (Ticket to Ride (World Snowboard Tour))
 5th – Slopestyle – 6Star Roxy Chicken Jam US (Ticket to Ride (World Snowboard Tour))

Highlights of Swatch TTR 2008/2009 Season 
 1st – Slopestyle – 4Star Horsefeathers Pleasure Jam (Ticket to Ride (World Snowboard Tour))
 6th – Halfpipe – 6Star Burton European Open (Ticket to Ride (World Snowboard Tour))
 6th – Slopestyle – 6Star Burton European Open (Ticket to Ride (World Snowboard Tour))

Career Highlights 

 2010 FIS World Cup / Kreischberg – Halfpipe – 1st Place
 2010 Winter Dew Tour – Slopestyle – 2nd Place
 2008 FIS Junior World Snowboard Championships / Italy – 1st Place

References

External links 
 Official Šárka Fanpage
 
 Šárka's Official Swatch TTR Profile
 Official Flow Snowboarding Profile
 

1990 births
Living people
People from Uherské Hradiště
Czech female snowboarders
Olympic snowboarders of the Czech Republic
Snowboarders at the 2010 Winter Olympics
Snowboarders at the 2014 Winter Olympics
Snowboarders at the 2018 Winter Olympics
Snowboarders at the 2022 Winter Olympics
X Games athletes
Lesbian sportswomen
Czech lesbians
Czech LGBT sportspeople
LGBT snowboarders
Sportspeople from the Zlín Region